Lebanon Airport may refer to:

 Lebanon Municipal Airport (New Hampshire) in Lebanon, New Hampshire, United States (FAA/IATA: LEB)
 Lebanon Municipal Airport (Tennessee) in Lebanon, Tennessee, United States (FAA: M54)
 Lebanon State Airport in Lebanon, Oregon, United States (FAA: S30)
 Lebanon-Warren County Airport in Lebanon, Ohio, United States (FAA: I68)
 Floyd W. Jones Lebanon Airport in Lebanon, Missouri, United States (FAA: LBO)

Airports in places named Lebanon:

 Beirut–Rafic Hariri International Airport in Beirut, Lebanon
 Boone County Airport (Arkansas) in Lebanon, Indiana, United States (FAA: 6I4)
 Keller Brothers Airport in Lebanon, Pennsylvania, United States (FAA: 08N)
 Mt. Hope Airport, a private use airport in Lebanon, Oregon, United States (FAA: OG10)
 Tallman Airport, a private use airport in Lebanon, Oregon, United States (FAA: 88OR)